The Chaplain of the United States Marine Corps (CHMC) is a position always filled by the officers serving as Deputy Chief of Chaplains of the United States Navy as a "dual hatted" billet since 2000. The CHMC oversees religious ministry in the Marine Corps which one Commandant of the Marine Corps defined as "a vital function which enhances the personal, family, and community readiness of our Marines, sailors, and their families. Chaplaincy supports the foundational principle of free exercise of religion and helps to enrich the spiritual, moral and ethical fabric of the military."

Assignment and responsibilities
The Chief of Chaplains of the United States Navy advises the Commandant of the Marine Corps, the Chief of Naval Operations, and the Commandant of the Coast Guard "on all matters pertaining to religion within the Navy, United States Marine Corps, and United States Coast Guard"—but the Deputy Chief of Chaplains serves as Chaplain of the Marine Corps, "advising the CMC on religious ministry matters in reference to support, personnel, plans, programs, policies, and facilities within the USMC."  Additionally, in the concurrent role of Navy Deputy Chief of Chaplains, the person holding this position is "Deputy Director of Religious Ministries," serving as the "principal assistant to the Chief of Chaplains."

Prior to 2000, when Rear Admiral Louis Iasiello became the first chaplain of flag rank to serve as Chaplain of the Marine Corps, that position was held by a senior Navy chaplain holding the rank of Navy Captain.

Marine Corps chaplain support
Navy chaplains support personnel throughout the Department of the Navy, which includes the Navy and Marine Corps, and also support personnel in the United States Coast Guard.

Uniforms
See: 
According to Chapter Six of the U.S. military uniform regulations, personnel assigned to the Marine Corps (including chaplains) have the option of wearing Marine Corps uniforms (and chaplains assigned to the Coast Guard may wear Coast Guard uniforms).

Chaplains of the U.S. Marine Corps (1969-present)

PrayersSee: Marine Prayer''

See also
Chief of Chaplains of the United States Navy
Chaplain of the Coast Guard
Chiefs of Chaplains of the United States
International Military Chiefs of Chaplains Conference
Military chaplain
United States Army Chaplain Corps
United States Air Force Chaplain Corps
Chaplain's Medal for Heroism

References

External links
Oral History Program, Chaplain Corps, United States Navy -- Documents

 
United States military chaplaincy